The Princess Grace Hospital Centre (CHPG), named after Princess Grace Kelly, is the only public hospital in Monaco. It is open 24/7.

History
The hospital was opened in 1902 by Prince Albert I as the Monaco Hospital. A service of pediatrics was created in 1949. In 1958, the hospital was further expanded and a polyclinic was added to the complex. The health institution was renamed after Princess Grace of Monaco.

Births
 Andrea Casiraghi (born 8 June 1984)
 Charlotte Casiraghi (born 3 August 1986)
 Pierre Casiraghi (born 5 September 1987)
 Louis Ducruet (born 26 November 1992)
 Pauline Ducruet (born 4 May 1994)
 Princess Gabriella, Countess of Carladès (born 10 December 2014)
 Jacques, Hereditary Prince of Monaco (born 10 December 2014)
 Chloe Cornelia Jennifer Tops, daughter of Jan Tops and Edwina Alexander (born 30 July 2017)

Deaths 
 Princess Grace of Monaco (died 14 September 1982)
 Princess Antoinette of Monaco (died 18 March 2011)
 Baroness Elizabeth-Ann de Massy (died 10 June 2020)

Other 

In 2015, it was certified by the Haute Autorité de Santé.

In 2020 a portrait of Princess Grace by Marcos Marin was installed in the hospital.

References

External links
 Princess Grace Hospital Centre 

1902 establishments in Monaco
Hospitals in Monaco
Grace Kelly
La Colle, Monaco
Hospitals established in 1902